Eszter Papp (born 12 September 1989 in Szombathely) is a Hungarian football goalkeeper currently playing in the Hungarian First Division for Viktória FC-Szombathely. She is a member of the Hungarian national team.

References

1989 births
Living people
Hungarian women's footballers
Hungary women's international footballers
Viktória FC-Szombathely players
Women's association football goalkeepers
Sportspeople from Szombathely